Chih-Tang "Tom" Sah (born in November 1932 in Beijing, China) is a Chinese-American electronics engineer and condensed matter physicist. He is best known for inventing CMOS (complementary MOS) logic with Frank Wanlass at Fairchild Semiconductor in 1963. CMOS is now used in nearly all modern very large-scale integration (VLSI) semiconductor devices.

He was the Pittman Eminent Scholar and a Graduate Research Professor at the University of Florida from 1988 to 2010. He was a Professor of Physics and Professor of Electrical and Computer Engineering, emeritus, at the University of Illinois at Urbana-Champaign, where he taught for 26 years (1962-1988) and guided 40 students to the Ph.D. degree in electrical engineering and in physics and 34 MSEE theses. At the University of Florida, he guided 10 doctoral theses in EE. He has published more than 300 peer-reviewed journal articles with his graduate students and research associates, and presented about 200 invited lectures and 60 contributed papers in China, Europe, Japan, Taiwan and in the United States on transistor physics, technology and evolution.

He wrote a three-volume textbook titled Fundamentals of Solid State Electronics (FSSE, 1991). FSSE was translated into Chinese in 2003.

Biography 
Sah is a member of the distinguished Fuzhou Sah Family, descendants of the prominent Yuan dynasty official Sadula, in Fuzhou China. His father Pen-Tung Sah was a founding academician of Academia Sinica of China (1928-1949) and served as president of Xiamen University (1937-1945) and Secretary General of Academia Sinica of China (1945-1949). C.-T. Sah also had a younger brother Chih-Han Sah who was a mathematician and professor at the State University of New York at Stony Brook.

Sah received two B.S. degrees in 1953 in Electrical Engineering and Engineering Physics from the University of Illinois and the M.S. and Ph.D. degrees from Stanford University in 1954 and 1956, respectively. His doctoral thesis research was on traveling-wave tubes under the tutelage of Karl R. Spangenberg.

His industrial career in solid-state electronics began with William Shockley in 1956 and continued at Fairchild Semiconductor Corporation in Palo Alto from 1959 to 1964 until he became a professor of physics and electrical engineering at the University of Illinois for 25 years (1962–1988). Under the management of Gordon E. Moore, Victor H. Grinich and Robert N. Noyce at Fairchild, Sah directed a 64-member Fairchild Physics Department on the development of the first generation manufacturing technologies (oxidation, diffusion, epitaxy growth, and metal conductor thin film deposition) for volume production of silicon bipolar and MOS transistors and integrated circuit technology including oxide masking for impurity diffusion, stable Si MOS transistor, the CMOS circuit, origin of the low-frequency noise, the MOS transistor model used in the first circuit simulator, thin film integrated resistance and Si epitaxy process for bipolar integrated circuit production.

After the MOSFET (metal–oxide–semiconductor field-effect transistor, or MOS transistor) was first demonstrated by Mohamed Atalla and Dawon Kahng of Bell Labs in early 1960, Sah introduced MOS technology to Fairchild Semiconductor with his MOS-controlled tetrode fabricated in late 1960. In 1963, Sah invented the CMOS (complementary MOS) semiconductor device fabrication process with Frank Wanlass at Fairchild. CMOS is now used in nearly all modern LSI and VLSI devices.

He was the founding editor (1991) of the International Series on the Advances in Solid State Electronics and Technology (ASSET) which has published three titles by invited authors (1990s) and eight monographs (2007–2013) by invited authors on compact modelling of devices for computer aided design of integrated circuits, all with the World Scientific Publishing Company, Singapore. His previous (1961-2013) research has been on MOS transistor models since he was drafted in October 2004 by his young colleagues to join them, after 40 years of absence subsequent to the 1964-Sah, 1965-Sah-Pao and 1966-Pao-Sah journal articles on MOS transistor models, in order to help further in the development of compact models for computer aided design of nanometer MOS integrated circuits.  Since 2013, he has been studying condensed matter physics with his young colleague Bin Bin Jie, specifically water physics. 

For contributions in transistor physics and technology, he received the Browder H. Thomson best paper Prize (IRE-1962) for an author under 30, the J. J. Ebers Award in Electron Devices (1981) and the Jack Morton Award (1989), all from the IEEE, the Franklin Institute Certificate of Merit, the First Achievement Award in High Technology from the Asian-American Manufacturer Association in San Jose, CA (1984) (Co-recipient was Morris Chang), the Fourth Annual University Research Award of the Semiconductor Industry Association (1998), recipient in integrated circuit technology (Yung Cheng Fung in bioengineering) of the first Pioneer recognition Award of the Committee-of-100 (a Chinese-American citizen organization), the second annual Distinguished Lifetime Achievement Award of the Asian-American Engineer of the Year sponsored by the Chinese Institute of Engineering/USA (2003) and the Doctor Honoris Causa degree from the University of Leuven, Belgium (1975) and the Honorary Doctorate from Chiaotung University, Taiwan, R.O.C. (2004), and the National Honorary Doctorate of China (2010) nominated by Xiamen University.  He was also the recipient of the celebrated member of the IEEE Electron Device Society (2012).

He was listed in a survey by the Institute for Scientific Information as one of the world's 1000 most cited scientists during 1963-1978. He is a Life Fellow of the American Physical Society, the Franklin Institute and the IEEE, a Fellow of the American Association for the Advancement of Science, a member of the U.S. National Academy of Engineering (1986), the Academia Sinica in Taipei (1998) and the Chinese Academy of Sciences in Beijing (2000). He was appointed an Honorary Professor of Tsinghua University (2003), Peking University (2003) and Xiamen University (2004) of China.

Honors and awards 
 2012 - Celebrated Member of the IEEE Electron Device Society.
2010 - National Honorary Doctorate of China nominated by Xiamen University.
2004 - Honorary Doctorate, National Chiao-Tung University
 2003 - Distinguished Lifetime Achievement Award, Chinese Institute of Engineers USA
 2002 - Committee-100 Pioneer Recognition Award
 2000 - Elected to the Chinese Academy of Sciences
 1999 - Academician, Academia Sinica of Taipei
 1999 - Semiconductor Industry Association University Research Award
 1998 - University Research Award, U S Semiconductor Industry Association
 1995 - Fellow, American Association of Advanced of Science
 1995 - IEEE Life Fellow
 1994 - Alumni Achievement Award, University of Illinois
 1989 - IEEE Jack Morton Award
 1986 - Elected a member of the National Academy of Engineering in 1986 for fundamental contributions leading to the characterization, development, and engineering of silicon diodes, transistors, and integrated circuits.
 1981 - J. J. Ebers Award, IEEE Electron Device Society
1978 - 1000 World's Most Cited Scientists, 1965–1978, Institute for Scientific Information
 1975 - Doctoris Honoris Causa, K. U. Leuven, Belgium
 1975 - Franklin Institute Certificate of Merit
 1971 - Fellow, American Physical Society
 1969 - Fellow, Institute of Electrical & Electronic Engineers

Patents 
 3,204,160 - Surface Potential Controlled Semiconductor Device, August 1965
 3,280,391 - High Frequency Transistor, October 1966
 3,243,669 - Surface Potential Controlled Semiconductor Device, March 1969
 4,343,962 - Oxide Charge Induced High Low Junction Emitter Solar Cell, with J. G. Fossum, S. C. Pao, F. A. Lindholm, 1982
Patent Pending - DCIV Methodology for Rapid Determination of Reliability of Transistors.

References 

1932 births
Living people
American electronics engineers
Chinese emigrants to the United States
Educators from Beijing
Engineers from Beijing
Fellows of the American Physical Society
Foreign members of the Chinese Academy of Sciences
Members of Academia Sinica
Members of the United States National Academy of Engineering
MOSFETs
Stanford University alumni
University of Florida faculty
Grainger College of Engineering alumni